Yury  Rafaelovich Dokhoian (26 October 1964 – 1 July 2021) was a Russian Grandmaster of chess (1988) of Armenian origin.

Career
Dokhoian played several times in the first league of the USSR Chess Championship. In 1986, he tied for second place in the All-Union tournament of young masters. He came first in Bucharest 1986, first in Plovdiv 1988, tied for second in Budapest 1988, third behind Smbat Lputian and Lev Psakhis in Yerevan 1988, third in Sochi 1988, tied for first with Friso Nijboer in Wijk aan Zee 1989 and with Yury Piskov in Copenhagen 1991, first in Berlin 1992, first in Bad Godesberg 1993, first in Lublin 1993, first in Bonn 1993, tied for first with Tony Miles in Munster 1993.

According to Chessmetrics, at his peak in February 1989 Dokhoian's play was equivalent to a rating of 2687, and he was ranked number 33 in the world. His best single performance was at Yerevan 1988, where he scored 9 of 13 possible points (69%) against 2598-rated opposition, for a performance rating of 2703.

For many years, Dokhoian was Garry Kasparov's second. In 2009, he started cooperating with Sergey Karjakin, being at the same time the coach of the Russian women's team. He was also the coach of the female world class players, the sisters Tatiana and Nadezhda Kosintseva.
In 2007, he was awarded the title of FIDE Senior Trainer.

Death
On 1 July 2021, Dokhoian died in Moscow from COVID-19.

References

External links

Grandmaster Games Database - Yury Dokhoian
Yury Dokhoian - Articles - New In Chess
Chessmetrics Player Profile: Yury Dokhoian

1964 births
2021 deaths
Chess grandmasters
Chess coaches
National team coaches
Soviet chess players
Russian people of Armenian descent
Russian chess players
Armenian chess players
Sportspeople from Altai Krai
People from Altai Krai
Deaths from the COVID-19 pandemic in Russia